May-en-Multien Aerodrome,  was a temporary World War I airfield in France.  It was located 1/2 miles south of the commune of May-en-Multien, in the Île-de-France region in north-central France.

Overview
The airfield was a temporary facility used by the French Aeronautique Militaire from early June 1918, most likely consisting of no more than a few tents, then later for a very short period on 5–10 August by the I Corps Observation Group as a forward operating airfield during the Aisne-Marne Offensive Campaign. Its HQ and two squadrons, the 1st and 12th Aero Squadron operated from the field until moving out during the middle of August to Coincy Aerodrome.

It was then once again used by the French Air Service on 7–21 September 1918. By the time of the Armistice, the airfield had already been returned to agricultural use.

Known units assigned
 Headquarters, I Corps Observation Group, 5–10 August 1918
 1st Aero Squadron (Observation) 5–10 August 1918
 12th Aero Squadron (Observation) 3–10 August 1918

See also

 List of Air Service American Expeditionary Force aerodromes in France

References

 Series "D", Volume 2, Squadron histories,. Gorrell's History of the American Expeditionary Forces Air Service, 1917–1919, National Archives, Washington, D.C.

External links

World War I sites of the United States
World War I airfields in France